Lower urinary tract symptoms (LUTS) refer to a group of clinical symptoms involving the bladder, urinary sphincter, urethra and, in men, the prostate. The term is more commonly applied to men—over 40% of older men are affected—but lower urinary tract symptoms also affect women. The condition is also termed prostatism in men, but LUTS is preferred.

Symptoms and signs
Symptoms can be categorised into:

Filling (storage) or irritative symptoms
 Increased frequency of urination
 Increased urgency of urination
 Urge incontinence
 Excessive passage of urine at night

Voiding or obstructive symptoms
 Poor stream (unimproved by straining)
 Hesitancy 
 Terminal dribbling
 Incomplete voiding
 Urinary retention
 Overflow incontinence (occurs in chronic retention)
 Episodes of near retention
As the symptoms are common and non-specific, LUTS is not necessarily a reason to suspect prostate cancer. Large studies of patients have also failed to show any correlation between lower urinary tract symptoms and a specific diagnosis. Also, recently a report of lower urinary tract symptoms even with malignant features in the prostate failed to be associated with prostate cancer after further laboratory investigation of the biopsy.

Causes

 Benign prostatic hyperplasia (BPH)
 Bladder stone
 Cancer of the bladder and prostate
 Detrusor muscle weakness and/or instability
 Diabetes
 Use of ketamine
 Neurological conditions; for example multiple sclerosis, spinal cord injury, cauda equina syndrome
 Prostatitis, including IgG4-related prostatitis
 Urethral stricture
 Urinary tract infections (UTIs)

Diagnosis
The International Prostate Symptom Score (IPSS) can be used to gauge the symptoms, along with physician examination. Other primary and secondary tests are often carried out, such as a PSA (Prostate-specific antigen) test, urinalysis, ultrasound, urinary flow studies, imaging, temporary prostatic stent placement, prostate biopsy and/or cystoscopy.

Placement of a temporary prostatic stent as a differential diagnosis test can help identify whether LUTS symptoms are directly related to obstruction of the prostate or to other factors worth investigation.

Treatment
Treatment will depend on the cause, if one is found. For example; with a UTI, a course of antibiotics would be given; appropriate medication would be administered to treat  benign prostatic hyperplasia.

Lifestyle changes
Other treatments include lifestyle advice; for example, avoiding dehydration in recurrent cystitis.

Men with prostatic hypertrophy are advised to sit down whilst urinating. A 2014 meta-analysis found that, for elderly males with LUTS, sitting to urinate meant there was a decrease in post-void residual volume (PVR, ml), increased maximum urinary flow (Qmax, ml/s), which is comparable with pharmacological intervention, and decreased the voiding time (VT, s). The improved urodynamic profile is related to a lower risk of urologic complications, such as cystitis and bladder stones.

Physical activity

Physical activity has been recommended as a treatment for urinary tract symptoms. A 2019 Cochrane review of six studies involving 652 men assessing the effects of physical activity alone, physical activity as a part of a self-management program, among others. The evidence from this review states that there are important uncertainties whether physical activity is helpful in men experiencing urinary symptoms caused by benign prostatic hyperplasia.

Medications 
With benign prostatic enlargement causes of LUTS, people may be offered a variety of medications (as a single drug or combining them) when there are persistent moderate symptoms:
 Alpha blockers
 5-alpha reductase inhibitors
 Phosphodiesterase inhibitors
 Muscarinic receptor antagonists
 Plants extracts (phytotherapy)
 Beta-3 agonist

If medical treatment fails, or is not an option; a number of surgical techniques to destroy part or all of the prostate have been developed.

Surgical treatment
Surgical treatment of LUTS can include:

 Ablation procedures - used in treating both bladder tumours and bladder outlet obstruction, such as prostate conditions.
 Bladder-neck incision (BNI)
 Removal of the prostate - open, robotic, and endoscopic techniques are used.
 Stenting of the prostate and urethra.
 Transurethral resection of the prostate (TURP)
 Transurethral microwave thermotherapy
 Urethral dilatation, a common treatment for strictures.

Epidemiology
 Prevalence increases with age. The prevalence of nocturia in older men is about 78%. Older men have a higher incidence of LUTS than older women.
 Around one third of men will develop urinary tract (outflow) symptoms, of which the principal underlying cause is benign prostatic hyperplasia.
 Once symptoms arise, their progress is variable and unpredictable with about one third of patients improving, one third remaining stable and one third deteriorating.

References

Further reading 

 
 
 NHS; Cancer Screening Programmes. Prostate Cancer Risk Management.

External links 

 LUTS in men - Patient.info
 LUTS in women - Patient.info

Urological conditions
Symptoms and signs: Urinary system